Seyyit Hışırlı (born March 1, 1949) is a Turkish wrestler.

Hışırlı competed at the 1972 Summer Olympics in the Greco-Roman 68 kg division, and at the 1970 FILA Wrestling World Championships.

References

External links
 

1949 births
Living people
Olympic wrestlers of Turkey
Wrestlers at the 1972 Summer Olympics
Turkish male sport wrestlers
20th-century Turkish people